Man and Boy is a play by Terence Rattigan. It was first performed at The Queen's Theatre, London, and Brooks Atkinson Theatre, New York, in 1963, with Charles Boyer starring as Gregor Antonescu. It was poorly received, with a limited London run and only 54 performances on Broadway; but was revived by Maria Aitken in 2005 at the Duchess Theatre, London, with David Suchet as Gregor Antonescu, to great acclaim. Maria Aitken again directed the play for Roundabout Theatre Company on Broadway in the fall of 2011 at the American Airlines Theatre starring Tony Award winner Frank Langella as Antonescu.

The Australian premiere of Man and Boy was performed at the Garrick Theatre in Perth, Western Australia, in June 2007.

Synopsis
The play is a study of a ruthless, sociopathic businessman: his inability to love and the impact of this on others (notably, his son and his wife). The central character Gregor Antonescu was based on the lives of Ivar Kreuger, the Swedish Match King, and Samuel Insull the Anglo-American investor.

Original Broadway production
The play, directed by Michael Benthall, opened at the Brooks Atkinson Theatre on 12 November 1963, with the following cast:

Gregor Antonescu  – Charles Boyer
Countess Antonescu –  Jane Downs
Basil Anthony – Barry Justice 
Sven Johnson –  Geoffrey Keen 
David Beeston – William Smithers 
Carol Penn – Louise Sorel
Mark L. Harris – Austin Willis

References

External links

1963 plays
Plays by Terence Rattigan
West End plays